Sycamore Corner is an extinct town that was located in Jordan Township in Warren County, Indiana, between the towns of Stewart and Judyville.

Even though the community no longer exists, it is still cited by the USGS.

Geography
Sycamore Corner was at the intersection of county roads 300 North and 600 West, roughly two miles west of Judyville.

References

Former populated places in Warren County, Indiana
Ghost towns in Indiana